Flores is one of the Lesser Sunda Islands, a group of islands in the eastern half of Indonesia. Including the Komodo Islands off its west coast (but excluding the Solor Archipelago to the east of Flores), the land area is 15,530.58 km2, and the population was 1,878,875 in the 2020 Census (including various offshore islands); the official estimate as at mid 2021 was 1,897,550. The largest towns are Maumere and Ende. The name Flores is the Portuguese and Spanish word for "Flowers".

Flores is located east of Sumbawa and the Komodo islands, and west of the Solor Islands and the Alor Archipelago. To the southeast is Timor. To the south, across the Sumba Strait, is Sumba island and to the north, beyond the Flores Sea, is Sulawesi.

Among all islands containing Indonesian territory, Flores is the 10th most populous after Java, Sumatra, Borneo (Kalimantan), Sulawesi, New Guinea, Bali, Madura, Lombok, and Timor and also the 10th biggest island of Indonesia.

Until the arrival of modern humans, Flores was inhabited by Homo floresiensis, a pygmy archaic human.

Etymology
Unlike most islands in the Indonesian archipelago, the modern name Flores was given by the Portuguese, from Cabo das Flores (Cape of Flowers), the Portuguese term for the eastern part of the island. This part of the island, originally called Kopondai, was so named by the Portuguese because of the flowering Delonix regia trees found there. The original name of Flores was Nipa, referring to the serpent.

History

Prehistory

Before the arrival of modern humans, Flores was occupied by Homo floresiensis, a pygmy archaic human. The ancestors of Homo floresiensis arrived on the island between 1.3 and 1 million years ago.

Remains of nine individuals have been found, and the dominant consensus is that these remains do represent a distinct species due to anatomical differences from modern humans. The most recent evidence shows that Homo floresiensis likely became extinct 50,000 years ago, around the time of modern human arrival to the archipelago.

Modern history

Portuguese traders and missionaries came to Flores in the 16th century, mainly to Larantuka and Sikka. Their influence is still discernible in Sikka's language, culture and religion. The first Portuguese visit took place in 1511, through the expedition of António de Abreu and his vice-captain Francisco Serrão, en route through the Sunda islands.

The Dominican order was extremely important in this island, as well as in the neighbouring islands of Timor and Solor. When in 1613 the Dutch attacked the Fortress of Solor, the population of this fort, led by the Dominicans, moved to the harbor town of Larantuka, on the eastern coast of Flores. This population was mixed, of Portuguese and local islander descent and Larantuqueiros, Topasses or, as Dutch knew them, the 'Black Portuguese' (Zwarte Portugezen).

The Larantuqueiros or Topasses became the dominant sandalwood trading people of the region for the next 200 years. This group used Portuguese as the language for worship, Malay as the language of trade and a mixed dialect as mother tongue. This was observed by William Dampier, an English privateer visiting the Island in 1699:

In the western part of Flores, the Manggarai came under the control of the sultanate of Bima, in eastern Sumbawa; the Dutch effectively established their administration over western Flores in 1907 while in 1929, the Bimanese sultanate ceded any control over Manggarai.

In 1846, Dutch and Portuguese initiated negotiations towards delimiting the territories but these negotiations led nowhere. In 1851 Lima Lopes, the new governor of Timor, Solor and Flores, agreed to sell eastern Flores and the nearby islands to the Dutch in return for a payment of 200,000 Florins in order to support his impoverished administration. Lima Lopes did so without the consent of Lisbon and was dismissed in disgrace, but his agreement was not rescinded and in 1854 Portugal ceded all its historical claims on Flores. After this, Flores became part of the territory of the Dutch East Indies.

During World War II a Japanese invasion force landed at Reo on 14 May 1942 and occupied Flores. After the war Flores became part of independent Indonesia.

On 12 December 1992, an earthquake measuring 7.8 on the Richter scale killed 2,500 people in and around Maumere, including islands off the north coast.

In 2017 two men were killed in Flores due to land disputes between warrior clans; the Mbehel, a West Manggarai mountain tribe, and the Rangko from Sulawesi island who helped build Manggarai and were given land near Labuan Bajo by the Manggarai king.

Administration

Flores is part of the East Nusa Tenggara province. The island along with smaller minor islands are split into eight regencies (local government divisions); from west to east these are: Manggarai Barat (West Manggarai), Manggarai (Central Manggarai), Manggarai Timur (East Manggarai), Ngada, Nagekeo, Ende, Sikka and part of Flores Timur (East Flores). Flores has 35.22% of the East Nusa Tenggara provincial population , and is the largest of all islands in the province, with the second-largest population (Timor has slightly more).

Notes: (a) figures include Komodo and Rinca Islands off the west coast of Flores; these islands are part of a National Park and thus poorly inhabited. (b) only the eight districts of this regency actually on Flores Island are included; the three districts comprising Solor Island and the eight districts on Adonara Island are excluded.

The main towns on Flores are Maumere, Ende, Ruteng, Larantuka and Bajawa, listed with their populations as at mid 2021.
 Maumere, 88,391 inhabitants
 Ende, 87,411 inhabitants
 Ruteng, 41,801 inhabitants
 Larantuka, 41,469 inhabitants
 Bajawa, 39,715 inhabitants

Flora and fauna

The Komodo dragon is endemic to Flores and surrounding islands, and has been continuously present on Flores for at least 1.4 million years. Today, it is confined to a handful of small areas on Flores itself.

The endemic fauna of Flores includes a number of rats (Murinae), some of which are now extinct, ranging from small sized forms such as Hainald's rat and the Polynesian rat (which possibly originated on the island), medium sized such as Komodomys, and giant such as Spelaeomys and Papagomys, the largest species of which, the still living Papagomys armandvillei (Flores giant rat) is approximately the size of a rabbit, with a weight of up to 2.5 kilograms.

Flores was also the habitat of several extinct dwarf forms of the proboscidean (elephant-relative) Stegodon, the most recent (Stegodon florensis insularis) disappearing approximately 50,000 years ago. The island prior to modern human arrival was also inhabited by the giant stork Leptoptilos robustus and the vulture Trigonoceps.

Culture

There are many languages spoken on the island of Flores, all of them belonging to the Austronesian family. In the west Manggarai is spoken; Riung, often classified as a dialect of Manggarai, is spoken in the north-central part of the island. In the centre of the island in the districts of Ngada, Nagekeo, and Ende there is what is variously called the Central Flores dialect chain or linkage. Within this area there are slight linguistic differences in almost every village. At least six separate languages are identifiable. These are from west to east: Ngadha, Nage, Keo, Ende, Lio and Palu'e, which is spoken on the island with the same name off the north coast of Flores. Locals would probably also add So'a and Bajawa to this list, which anthropologists have labeled dialects of Ngadha. To the east, Sika and Lamaholot can be found.

The native peoples of Flores are mostly Roman Catholic Christians, whereas most other Indonesians are Muslim. As a consequence, Flores may be regarded as surrounded by a religious border. The prominence of Catholicism on the island results from its colonisation by Portugal in the east and early 20th-century support by the Dutch in the west. In other parts of Indonesia with significant Christian populations, such as the Maluku Islands and Sulawesi, the geographical divide is less rigid and Muslims and Christians sometimes live side by side. Flores thereby also has less religious violence than that which has sporadically occurred in other parts of Indonesia. There are several churches on the island. On 26 May 2019, Flores' St. Paul Catholic University of Indonesia was formally inaugurated by Indonesian Education Minister Mohamad Nasir, becoming the first Catholic University in Flores. Aside from Catholicism, Islam also has a presence on the island especially in some coastal communities.

Tourism
The most famous tourist attraction in Flores is the  Kelimutu volcano, containing three colored lakes, located in the district of Ende close to the town of Moni, although there is also the Inierie volcano near Bajawa. These crater lakes are in the caldera of a volcano, and fed by a volcanic gas source, resulting in highly acidic water. The colored lakes change colors on an irregular basis, depending on the oxidation state of the lake from bright red through green and blue.

There are snorkelling and diving locations along the north coast of Flores, most notably Maumere and Riung. However, due to the destructive practice of local fishermen using bombs to fish, and locals selling shells to tourists, combined with the after effects of a devastating tsunami in 1992, the reefs have slowly been destroyed.

Labuan Bajo, located on the western tip is often used by tourists as a base to visit Komodo and Rinca islands. Labuan Bajo also attracts scuba divers, as whale sharks inhabit the waters around Labuan bajo.

The Luba and Bena villages include traditional houses in Flores. Bena is also noted for its Stone Age megaliths.

Larantuka, on the isle's eastern end, is known for its Holy Week festivals.

In recent years, local tourist firms around Kelimutu have begun promoting cycling tours around Flores, some of which take up to five or six days depending on the particular program.

Economy
In addition to tourism, the main economic activities on Flores are agriculture, fishing and seaweed production. The primary food crops being grown on Flores are rice, maize, sweet potato and cassava, while the main cash crops are coffee, coconut, candle nut and cashew. Flores is one of the newest origins for Indonesian coffee. Previously, most Arabica coffee (Coffea arabica) from Flores was blended with other origins. Now, demand is growing for this coffee because of its heavy body and sweet chocolate, floral and woody notes.

Gallery

Transport 
There are at least six airports in Flores distributed along the island, ordered from west to east:
 Komodo Airport in Labuan Bajo
 Frans Sales Lega Airport or Ruteng airport
 Pahdamaleda Airport or Bajawa airport
 Turelelo Soa Airport in Bajawa
 H. Hasan Aroeboesman Airport or Ende airport
 Frans Xavier Seda Airport or Maumere airport
 Gewayantana Airport close to Larantuka city.

See also

 Dutch Empire
 Flores (Azores)
 Homo floresiensis
 Kingdom of Larantuka
 Manggarai people
 Maunura
 Nage tribe
 Portuguese Empire
 Simon Milward
 Theodorus Verhoeven

Notes

References

External links

Flores & Komodo – History 

Lesser Sunda Islands
Landforms of East Nusa Tenggara
 
Komodo National Park
Portuguese colonialism in Indonesia
Islands of Indonesia
Inner Banda Arc
Populated places in Indonesia